Martin Donald Sheargold (born 19 June 1971) is an Australian stand-up comedian and radio broadcaster.

Sheargold was part of Nova FM's national drive show Kate, Tim & Marty with Kate Ritchie and Tim Blackwell until 11 September 2020. He is currently the host of the Marty Sheargold Show on Triple M Melbourne.

Early life
Sheargold went to school at Daramalan College in Canberra.

Career
Sheargold's first job in radio was replacing Greg Fleet on a breakfast radio show in Adelaide. He appeared as a guest comedian on the RMITV show Under Melbourne Tonight on 2 November 1995.

Marty has also appeared in Australian TV comedy productions such as The Micallef Program in 1998 and  The Mick Molloy Show in 1999 where he appeared in the 'Bob's Scrapbook' segment. He was also seen on Russell Gilbert Live (2000) and Russell Gilbert Was Here! (2001), and as host, creator and writer on Hahn Ice Headliners (1997–98) on The Comedy Channel.

In 2003, Sheargold appeared in Bad Eggs, The Forest and in Welcher & Welcher as 'The Courier'. He returned to television in 2009 as Paolo in The Librarians.

From 2003 to 2008, Marty was the co-host of Triple M's The Shebang with Fifi Box and later a third host, Paul Murray, which initially aired as a national drive-time show, before moving to the breakfast slot in Sydney from 2007. The show finished in October 2008, with Sheargold being away because of the birth of his first daughter.

In May 2010, Sheargold joined Nova 106.9 replacing Ash Bradnam. In August 2011, Meshel, Tim and Marty moved to Melbourne and became the national drive show on Nova FM replacing Fitzy and Wippa. After Meshel Laurie departed in 2014, Kate Ritchie joined the drive show which became known as Kate, Tim & Marty.

Sheargold has been a panelist on Under Melbourne Tonight, The Micallef Program, The Mick Molloy Show, The Project, Dirty Laundry Live and Have You Been Paying Attention?.

In 2019, Sheargold made a return to standup comedy after 20 years away from the stage. He sold out the initial 11 shows in Sydney, Melbourne, Brisbane, Perth and  Adelaide. Due to the overwhelming success of the initial 11 shows, he added 27 additional shows to the tour in 2020, returning for more shows in all the major capital cities plus Hobart, Canberra and Cairns.

On 24 July 2020, Sheargold announced his resignation from Kate, Tim & Marty and his last show was on 11 September.

On 12 December 2020, after several months of media speculation, it was revealed that Sheargold would host the Marty Sheargold Show in 2021. The show would replace The Hot Breakfast on Triple M Melbourne after the departure of Eddie McGuire.

References

External links

Australian radio presenters
Living people
1971 births
Australian male comedians
Nova (radio network) announcers
Triple M presenters
People educated at Daramalan College